Agapetus montanus is a species of Caddisfly. It is endemic to the north-western states of the United States of America.

References

Glossosomatidae
Insects of the United States
Insects described in 1949